Sheikh Saad Al-Abdullah Al-Salim Al-Sabah (1930 – 13 May 2008) was the Emir of Kuwait from January 15 until his abdication 9 days later, succeeding Sheikh Jaber Al-Ahmad Al-Jaber Al-Sabah.

Saad was a general commander in the Military of Kuwait; in addition, the first to head the Kuwaiti Ministry of Interior until 16 February 1978 and the first military officer to head the Ministry of Defense since 1964.

Early life
Saad, who was born in 1930, belonged to the Al-Salem branch of the Al-Sabah family and was eldest son of Abdullah Al-Salem Al-Sabah, who ruled Kuwait from 1950 to 1965.

His mother was an enslaved Ethiopian until his father married her. He had two younger paternal half-brothers; Sheikh Khalid and Sheikh Ali. His youngest brother Sheikh Ali Abdullah Al-Salem Al-Sabah is a governor. He attended the Mubarakiya school in Kuwait and Hendon Police College in North London.

Early career
Saad debuted his career as the first military officer to head the ministry of interior and ministry of defense in 1962 and 1964, respectively. He served as the general commander of the Directorate of Public Security Force and the Directorate of Police from 1961 to 1962. Following the formation of the 3rd government on 6 December 1964; Saad was appointed both minister of interior and of defense simultaneously and held both posts until 1978. On 16 February 1978, he became Crown Prince and held the post until 13 July 2006.

First Gulf War
Saad was the leader involved in liberating Kuwait from Saddam's regime. He refused to deal with any of Iraq's ministers attempting to compromise the security of the country. During the exile of Jaber Al-Ahmad Al-Jaber Al-Sabah and his declaration of martial law.

Emir of Kuwait
Saad had suffered from colon disease, which led to speculation that he would refuse the Emirship. A declaration in November 2005 refuted such speculation, and Saad took office as Emir on 15 January 2006 upon Jaber's death.

However, Saad attended Jaber's funeral in a wheelchair, and his continued health problems caused some to question his ability to rule. Some members of the National Assembly expressed concern that Saad would not be able to deliver the two-line oath of office, scheduled for 24 January 2006.

On 24 January 2006, the National Assembly voted Saad out of office, moments before an official letter of abdication was received. The Kuwait Cabinet nominated Prime Minister Sabah Al-Ahmad Al-Jaber Al-Sabah to take over as Emir.

Academy of Saad Al-Abdullah for Security Sciences 
The college is in charge of training Kuwaiti Police members.

Personal life
Married to his cousin, Sheikha Latifa Fahad Al-Sabah, Saad had five daughters, Maryam, Hessa, Jamayel, Sheikha and Fadya, and one son, Fahad. One of his daughters, Sheika, controlled international marketing at Kuwait Petroleum Corporation (KPC). Until late August 1998, she was the executive assistant managing director for international marketing at the body. Another daughter, Hessa, was elected as vice president of the Arab-Italian chamber of commerce in October 2012. She is also the head of the Arab women's business council and representative of Kuwait in the Chamber's general assembly session.

Death

Saad died on 13 May 2008, aged 78, at Shaab Palace in Kuwait City from a heart attack.

See also
 House of Al-Sabah
 Mubarak Abdullah Al-Jaber Al-Sabah
 Fahad Al-Ahmed Al-Jaber Al-Sabah
 Flag of Kuwait

References

Sources

[http://ambassadors.net/archives/issue24/megastars.htmSheikh Saad Abdullah Al-Salem Al-Sabah: The Unforgettable Liberation Hero (1930–2008)], Ambassadors Online Magazine, vol. 11, issue 24 July 2008

|-

1930 births
2008 deaths
Honorary Knights Commander of the Order of St Michael and St George
Saad
Kuwaiti Muslims
Prime Ministers of Kuwait
Rulers of Kuwait
Muslim monarchs
Government ministers of Kuwait
Monarchs who abdicated
Defence ministers of Kuwait